Monsterwolf is a 2010 Syfy original television film directed by Todor Chapkanov and stars Leonor Varela, Robert Picardo, and Marc Macaulay. The film was part of Syfy's 31 Days of Halloween 2010 and premiered on Syfy October 9, 2010.

Premise
A group of people who represent an oil company find a new place to drill.  However, when they set off an explosion, it unleashes a wolf-like creature that kills all the workers.

Cast
 Leonor Varela as Maria
 Robert Picardo as Stark
 Marc Macaulay as Sheriff Bennett
 Steve Reevis as Chief Turner
 Jason London as Yale
 Jon Eyez as Coughlin
 Griff Furst as Chase
 Ricky Wayne as Deputy Higgins
 Nicole Barré as Crowell
 Amber Bartlett as Audrey
 Grant James as Burt

Reception 
Critical reception was negative. Dread Central rated the movie at 2 1/2 out of 5 blades, calling it "a fairly straightforward cliché-a-thon that wraps itself up in highly convenient third act character revelation that sure comes in handy when trying to send an eco-terrorist wolf monster back to its spiritual nature preserve. It’s also pretty watchable. I wouldn’t go so far as to call it pretty good, but it is certainly watchable in a nothing-better-on Saturday afternoon matinee sort of way." TV Spielfilm was ambivalent in their rating.

Curt Wagner for the Chicago Tribune panned Monsterwolf, criticizing it as "so bad it sucks - and it's not even about vampires!"

References

External links 

2010 horror films
Syfy original films
2010 television films
2010 films
American horror television films
2010s American films